Gladiolus caryophyllaceus is a Gladiolus species native to the Cape Provinces in South Africa. It is a weed in Western Australia.

References

External links
Weeds of Australia identification tool: Factsheet - Gladiolus caryophyllaceus. Queensland Government.

caryophyllaceus
Taxa named by Nicolaas Laurens Burman